Daria Kasatkina was the defending champion, but lost in the quarterfinals to Julia Görges.

Kiki Bertens won the title, despite being a match point down in the third set of her semifinal clash with Madison Keys. 
Bertens beat Görges in the final, 6–2, 6–1.

Seeds
The top eight seeds received a bye into the second round.

Draw

Finals

Top half

Section 1

Section 2

Bottom half

Section 3

Section 4

Qualifying

Seeds

Qualifiers

Lucky loser
  Dayana Yastremska

Draw

First qualifier

Second qualifier

Third qualifier

Fourth qualifier

Fifth qualifier

Sixth qualifier

Seventh qualifier

Eighth qualifier

References

 Main Draw
 Qualifying Draw

2018 WTA Tour
2018,Singles